Clarence Brickwood Kingsbury (3 November 1882 – 4 March 1949) was a British track cyclist who competed in the 1908 Summer Olympics. He belonged to the Paddington and North End cycling clubs.

Biography
Kingsbury was born and died in Portsmouth, Hampshire.

He was the son of Martha Brickwood (née White) and William Salter Kingsbury. His mother Martha was previously married to Thomas Brickwood of Brickwoods Brewery. In 1904 he married Maud Jennings.

In 1908 he won the gold medal in the 20 kilometres competition as well as in the team pursuit as member of the British team.

He finished fifth in the 5000 metres competition and was eliminated in the semi-finals of the 660 yards event. In the sprint event he participated in the final when the time limit was exceeded, resulting in the race being declared void and no medals being awarded.

Golden Book of Cycling
He was given his own entry in the Golden Book of Cycling.

Kingsbury was living at 41 Queens Road, Portsmouth, Hampshire, during the 1901 census, his occupation listed as 'cycle agent'.
When Kingsbury died he was living at 4 Nightingale Road, Southsea.

References

External links
 
 

1882 births
1949 deaths
English male cyclists
English Olympic medallists
English track cyclists
Olympic cyclists of Great Britain
Cyclists at the 1908 Summer Olympics
Olympic gold medallists for Great Britain
Sportspeople from Portsmouth
Olympic medalists in cycling
Medalists at the 1908 Summer Olympics